Forrest Breyfogle III is a management consultant, the CEO of consultant and training company Smarter Solutions, Inc. He served on the board of advisors for the University of Texas Center for Performance Excellence.

Career and education
Breyfogle graduated from the University of Missouri–Rolla (now the Missouri University of Science and Technology) with a bachelor's degree in mechanical engineering and began working for IBM. While working at IBM, Breyfogle returned to school and earned an MS in mechanical engineering from the University of Texas at Austin. He founded Smarter Solutions in 1992. Breyfogle is an Affiliate Instructor at Weatherhead School of Management (part of Case Western Reserve University). Breyfogle also wrote a series of books focused on IEE.

References

1946 births
Living people
American business writers
American management consultants
Cockrell School of Engineering alumni
Missouri University of Science and Technology alumni